Rev. Francis Edmund Cecil Byng, 5th Earl of Strafford (15 January 1835 – 18 January 1918) was an English Anglican minister and member of the peerage.

Background 
Byng was born 15 January 1835, third son of George Byng, 2nd Earl of Strafford. He was educated at Eton (where he took a Prince Albert Prize for Modern Languages) and Christ Church, Oxford, where he studied law and modern history.

Religious career 
After taking holy orders, Byng became the rector of Little Casterton, Rutland from 1859–62; served as vicar of Holy Trinity in Twickenham and chaplain at Hampton Court from 1862-67. He was appointed an honorary chaplain to Queen Victoria in 1867 and Chaplain-in-Ordinary in 1872; then served as Chaplain to the Speaker of the House of Commons from 1874-89. 

In 1867, Byng was appointed vicar of the high church St Peter's Church, Cranley Gardens, by Charles James Freake (who had the living of the church). He remained vicar of St Peter's, which became fashionable ("His fine presence, his beautiful voice and his high birth made him a favourite of the couples that were going to get married.") through 1889; and kept up a long correspondence with the former organist of St. Peter's, Sir Arthur Sullivan. In 1889, Bing was elected Grand Chaplain of Freemasonry in England.

Resignation from office 
In 1889 Byng reportedly suddenly resigned all his benefices and left London, supposedly owing to trouble over a gambling debt (he was said to be "addicted to cards").

Personal life 

On 8 June 1859, he married Florence Louisa Miles (1840–1862), daughter of Sir William Miles, 1st Baronet; she died in 1862 giving birth to their second son, Edmund. He succeeded to the earldom in May 1899 when his brother, Henry Byng, 4th Earl of Strafford, was decapitated in a railroading accident, a year after inheriting the title from their childless elder brother, George Byng, 3rd Earl of Strafford, the Liberal politician. 

On 4 August 1866, he married Emily Georgina Kerr, daughter of Admiral Lord Frederick Herbert Kerr; they had eight children of their own.

He was succeeded on his death by his second son, (the first, Arthur, having died in infancy) Edmund Byng, 6th Earl of Strafford.

References 

1835 births
1918 deaths
19th-century English Anglican priests
Ordained peers
Earls in the Peerage of the United Kingdom
People educated at Eton College
Alumni of Christ Church, Oxford
Francis
Chaplains of the House of Commons (UK)